Donald Sheldon (May 26, 1930 – June 11, 2015) was an American cyclist. He competed in three events at the 1952 Summer Olympics. He also won the Tour of Somerville in 1947 and 1948.

References

External links
 

1930 births
2015 deaths
American male cyclists
Olympic cyclists of the United States
Cyclists at the 1952 Summer Olympics
Sportspeople from Jersey City, New Jersey
American track cyclists